Andromeda Conquest is a 1982 strategy video game released for the Apple II, Atari 8-bit family, Commodore PET, DOS, and TRS-80. It had an influence on the 4X game genre.

Reception
Brian J. Murphy of Creative Computing praised Andromeda Conquest for its playability and multi-player mode but criticized the solitaire game, describing it as "dull". Computer Gaming Worlds Floyd Mathews praised the game as "relatively simple, but exciting". However, in 1992, in its retrospective survey of science fiction games, the magazine gave the title two of five stars.

References

1982 video games
Apple II games
Atari 8-bit family games
Avalon Hill video games
Commodore PET games
North America-exclusive video games
Strategy video games
TRS-80 games